Ayaan Hirsi Ali (Somali: Ayaan Xirsi Cali: Ayān Ḥirsī 'Alī; born Ayaan Hirsi Magan, 13 November 1969) is a Somali-born Dutch-American activist and former politician. She is a critic of Islam and advocate for the rights and self-determination of Muslim women, opposing forced marriage, honor killing, child marriage, and female genital mutilation. She has founded an organisation for the defense of women's rights, the AHA Foundation. Ayaan Hirsi Ali works for the Hoover Institution at Stanford University, the American Enterprise Institute, and was a senior fellow at the Future of Democracy Project at Harvard Kennedy School.

In 2003, Hirsi Ali was elected a member of the House of Representatives, the lower house of the States General of the Netherlands, representing the centre-right People's Party for Freedom and Democracy (VVD). A political crisis related to the validity of her Dutch citizenship, namely the accusation that she had lied on her application for political asylum, led to her resignation from parliament, and indirectly to the fall of the second Balkenende cabinet in 2006.

Hirsi Ali is a former Muslim who became an atheist. In 2004, she collaborated on a short film with Theo van Gogh, titled Submission, which depicted the oppression of women under fundamentalist Islamic law, and was critical of the Muslim canon itself. The film led to death threats, and van Gogh was murdered several days after the film's release by Mohammed Bouyeri, a Moroccan-Dutch Islamic terrorist. Hirsi Ali maintains that "Islam is part religion, and part a political-military doctrine, the part that is a political doctrine contains a world view, a system of laws and a moral code that is totally incompatible with our constitution, our laws, and our way of life." In her 2015 book Heretic, Hirsi Ali called for a reformation of Islam by countering Islamism and supporting reformist Muslims.

In 2005, Hirsi Ali was named by Time magazine as one of the 100 most influential people in the world. She has also received several awards, including a free speech award from the Danish newspaper Jyllands-Posten, the Swedish Liberal Party's Democracy Prize, and the Moral Courage Award for commitment to conflict resolution, ethics, and world citizenship. Critics accuse Ali of having built her political career on islamophobia, and question her scholarly credentials "to speak authoritatively about Islam and the Arab world". Her works have been accused of using neo-orientalist portrayals and perpetuating a "civilizing mission" discourse. Hirsi Ali married Scottish-American historian Niall Ferguson in 2011, migrated to the United States and became a U.S. citizen in 2013.

Early life and education 

Ayaan was born in 1969 in Mogadishu, Somalia. Her father, Hirsi Magan Isse, was a prominent member of the Somali Salvation Democratic Front and a leading figure in the Somali Revolution. Shortly after she was born, her father was imprisoned due to his opposition to Siad Barre’s Communist government. Hirsi Ali's father had studied abroad and was opposed to female genital mutilation, but while he was imprisoned, Hirsi Ali's grandmother had a man perform the procedure on her, when Hirsi Ali was five years old. According to Hirsi Ali, she was fortunate that her grandmother could not find a woman to do the procedure, as the mutilation was "much milder" when performed by men.

After her father escaped from prison, he and the family left Somalia in 1977, going to Saudi Arabia and then to Ethiopia, before settling in Nairobi, Kenya by 1980. There he established a comfortable upper-class life for them. Hirsi Ali attended the English-language Muslim Girls' Secondary School. By the time she reached her teens, Saudi Arabia was funding religious education in numerous countries and its religious views were becoming influential among many Muslims. A charismatic religious teacher, trained under this aegis, joined Hirsi Ali's school. She inspired the teenaged Ayaan, as well as some fellow students, to adopt the more rigorous Saudi Arabian interpretations of Islam, as opposed to the more relaxed versions then current in Somalia and Kenya. Hirsi Ali said later that she had long been impressed by the Qur'an and had lived "by the Book, for the Book" throughout her childhood.

She sympathised with the views of the Islamist Muslim Brotherhood, and wore a hijab with her school uniform. This was unusual at the time but has become more common among some young Muslim women. At the time, she agreed with the fatwa proclaimed against British Indian writer Salman Rushdie in reaction to the portrayal of the Islamic prophet Muhammad in his novel The Satanic Verses. After completing secondary school, Hirsi Ali attended a secretarial course at Valley Secretarial College in Nairobi for one year. As she was growing up, she also read English-language adventure stories, such as the Nancy Drew series, with modern heroine archetypes who pushed the limits of society.
Also, remembering her grandmother refusing soldiers entry into her house, Hirsi Ali associated with Somalia "the picture of strong women: the one who smuggles in the food, and the one who stands there with a knife against the army and says, 'You cannot come into the house.' And I became like that. And my parents and my grandmother don't appreciate that now—because of what I've said about the Qur'an. I have become them, just in a different way."

Early life in the Netherlands 

Hirsi Ali arrived in the Netherlands in 1992. That year she had travelled from Kenya to visit her family in Düsseldorf and Bonn, Germany and gone to the Netherlands to escape an arranged marriage. Once there, she requested political asylum and obtained a residence permit. She used her paternal grandfather's early surname on her application and has since been known in the West as Ayaan Hirsi Ali. She received a residence permit within three or four weeks of arriving in the Netherlands.

At first she held various short-term jobs, ranging from cleaning to sorting post. She worked as a translator at a Rotterdam refugee center which, according to a friend interviewed in 2006 by The Observer newspaper, marked her deeply.

As an avid reader, in the Netherlands she found new books and ways of thought that both stretched her imagination and frightened her. Sigmund Freud's work introduced her to an alternative moral system that was not based on religion. During this time she took courses in Dutch and a one-year introductory course in social work at the Hogeschool De Horst in Driebergen. She has said that she was impressed with how well Dutch society seemed to function. To better understand its development, she studied at the Leiden University (Leiden, Netherlands), where she obtained an MSc degree in political science in 2000.

Between 1995 and 2001, Hirsi Ali also worked as an independent Somali-Dutch interpreter and translator, frequently working with Somali women in asylum centers, hostels for abused women, and at the Dutch immigration and naturalization service (IND, Immigratie- en Naturalisatiedienst). While working for the IND, she became critical of the way it handled asylum seekers. Hirsi Ali speaks six languages: English, Somali, Arabic, Swahili, Amharic, and Dutch.

Political career 

After gaining her degree, Hirsi Ali became a Fellow at the Wiardi Beckman Stichting (WBS), a think tank of the center-left Labour Party (PvdA). Leiden University Professor Ruud Koole was steward of the party. Hirsi Ali's writing at the WBS was inspired by the work of the neoconservative Orientalist Bernard Lewis.

She became disenchanted with Islam, and was shocked by the September 11 attacks in the United States in 2001, for which al-Qaeda eventually claimed responsibility. After listening to videotapes of Osama bin Laden citing "words of justification" in the Qur'an for the attacks, she wrote, "I picked up the Qur'an and the hadith and started looking through them, to check. I hated to do it, because I knew that I would find Bin Laden's quotations in there." During this time of transition, she came to regard the Qur'an as relative—it was a historical record and "just another book."

Reading Atheïstisch manifest ("Atheist Manifesto") of Leiden University philosopher Herman Philipse helped to convince her to give up religion. She renounced Islam and acknowledged her disbelief in God in 2002. She began to formulate her critique of Islam and Islamic culture, published many articles on these topics, and became a frequent speaker on television news programs and in public debate forums. She discussed her ideas at length in a book titled De zoontjesfabriek (The Son Factory) (2002). In this period, she first began to receive death threats.

Cisca Dresselhuys, editor of the feminist magazine Opzij, introduced Hirsi Ali to Gerrit Zalm, the parliamentary leader of the centre-right People's Party for Freedom and Democracy (VVD), and party member Neelie Kroes, then European Commissioner for Competition. At their urging, Hirsi Ali agreed to switch to their party of the VVD and stood for election to Parliament. Between November 2002 and January 2003, she lived abroad while on the payroll as an assistant of the VVD.

In 2003, aged 33, Hirsi Ali successfully fought a parliamentary election. She said that the Dutch welfare state had overlooked abuse of Muslim women and girls in the Netherlands and their social needs, contributing to their isolation and oppression.

During her tenure in Parliament, Hirsi Ali continued her criticisms of Islam and many of her statements provoked controversy. In an interview in the Dutch newspaper Trouw, she said that by Western standards, Muhammad as represented in the Qu'ran would be considered a pedophile. A religious discrimination complaint was filed against her on 24 April 2003 by Muslims who objected to her statements. The Prosecutor's office decided not to initiate a case, because her critique did "not put forth any conclusions in respect to Muslims and their worth as a group is not denied".

Film with Theo van Gogh 

Working with writer and director Theo van Gogh, Hirsi Ali wrote the script and provided the voice-over for Submission (2004), a short film that criticised the treatment of women in Islamic society. Juxtaposed with passages from the Qur'an were scenes of actresses portraying Muslim women suffering abuse. An apparently nude actress dressed in a semi-transparent burqa was shown with texts from the Qur'an written on her skin. These texts are among those often interpreted as justifying the subjugation of Muslim women. The film's release sparked outrage among many Dutch Muslims.

Mohammed Bouyeri, a 26-year-old Dutch Moroccan Islamist and member of the Muslim terrorist organisation Hofstad Group, assassinated van Gogh in an Amsterdam street on 2 November 2004. Bouyeri shot van Gogh with a handgun eight times, first from a distance and then at short range as the director lay wounded on the ground. He was already dead when Bouyeri cut his throat with a large knife and tried to decapitate him. Bouyeri left a letter pinned to Van Gogh's body with a small knife; it was primarily a death threat to Hirsi Ali. The Dutch secret service immediately raised the level of security they provided to Hirsi Ali. Bouyeri was sentenced to life imprisonment without parole.

In 2004, a rap song about Hirsi Ali titled "Hirsi Ali Dis" was produced and distributed on the internet by a group called "The Hague Connection". The lyrics included violent threats against her life. The rappers were prosecuted under Article 121 of the Dutch criminal code because they hindered Hirsi Ali's execution of her work as a politician. In 2005 they were sentenced to community service and a suspended prison sentence.

Hirsi Ali went into hiding, aided by government security services, who moved her among several locations in the Netherlands. They moved her to the United States for several months. On 18 January 2005, she returned to parliament. On 18 February 2005, she revealed where she and her colleague Geert Wilders were living. She demanded a normal, secured house, which she was granted one week later.

In January 2006, Hirsi Ali was recognised as "European of the Year" by Reader's Digest, an American magazine. In her speech, she urged action to prevent Iran from developing nuclear weapons. She also said that Mahmoud Ahmadinejad should be taken at his word in wanting to organise a conference to investigate objective evidence of the Holocaust, noting that the subject is not taught in the Middle East. She said, "Before I came to Europe, I'd never heard of the Holocaust. That is the case with millions of people in the Middle East. Such a conference should be able to convince many people away from their denial of the genocide against the Jews." She also said that what some have described as "Western values" of freedom and justice were universal. But she thought that Europe has done far better than most areas of the world in providing justice, as it has guaranteed the freedom of thought and debate required for critical self-examination. She said communities cannot reform unless "scrupulous investigation of every former and current doctrine is possible." Hirsi Ali was nominated as a candidate for the Nobel Peace Prize the same month by Norwegian parliamentarian Christian Tybring-Gjedde.

In March 2006, she co-signed a letter titled "MANIFESTO: Together facing the new totalitarianism". Among the eleven other signatories was Salman Rushdie; as a teenager, Hirsi Ali had supported the fatwa against him. The letter was published in response to protests in the Islamic world surrounding the Jyllands-Posten Muhammad cartoons controversy in Denmark, and it supported freedom of press and freedom of expression.

On 27 April 2006, a Dutch judge ruled that Hirsi Ali had to abandon her current secure house at a secret address in the Netherlands. Her neighbors had complained that she created an unacceptable security risk, but the police had testified that this neighborhood was one of the safest places in the country, as they had many personnel assigned to it for Hirsi Ali's protection. In an interview in early 2007, Hirsi Ali noted that the Dutch state had spent about €3.5 million on her protection; threats against her produced fear, but she believed it important to speak her mind. While regretting van Gogh's death, she said she was proud of their work together.

A private trust, the Foundation for Freedom of Expression, was established in 2007 in the Netherlands to help fund protection of Ayaan Hirsi Ali and other Muslim dissidents.

Dutch citizenship controversy 

In May 2006, the TV programme Zembla reported that Hirsi Ali had given false information about her name, her age, and her country of residence when originally applying for asylum. In her asylum application, she had claimed to be fleeing a forced marriage, but the Zembla coverage featured interviews with her family, who denied that claim. The program alleged that, contrary to Hirsi Ali's claims of having fled a Somali war zone, the MP had been living comfortably in upper middle-class conditions safely in Kenya with her family for at least 12 years before she sought refugee status in the Netherlands in 1992.

In her version of events, she had fled civil war in Somalia, was forced into an arranged marriage with a man whom she had never met, and was not present at her own wedding. Upon escaping she was forced into hiding in the Netherlands, for her ex-husband and father's brothers would have been by Somali custom, required to perform an honor killing. The accounts of various witnesses varied greatly from hers. According to them, she left Somalia prior to any mass violence, and led a comfortable, upper-middle class life in neighboring Kenya, where she attended a Muslim Girls' school and received a full western-style education with focus on the Humanities and Science, her brother attended a Christian school, she lied to the Dutch immigration service about coming from Somalia in order not to be sent back to Kenya, and they allege she met her husband a few days before her wedding. After several meetings with him, they allege she agreed to the marriage, even though her mother said Ayaan should finish her education so she could afford to leave him if the marriage should prove unsuccessful. They also allege that Hirsi Ali was present at the wedding, something her brother later denied, and according to several witnesses appeared to be enjoying herself. Hirsi Ali denies all of this. On her way to Canada, she says she travelled to the Netherlands by train during a stopover in Germany, and applied for political asylum. During her stay in the Netherlands she regularly received letters from her father. The documentary also quoted several native Somalis as saying there is no tradition of honor killing in Somalia.

Hirsi Ali had already admitted to friends and VVD party colleagues that she had lied about her full name, date of birth, and the manner in which she had come to the Netherlands in her asylum application, but persisted in saying it was true that she was trying to flee a forced marriage. In her first book, The Son Factory (2002), she had already provided her real name and date of birth, and she had also stated these in a September 2002 interview published in the political magazine HP/De Tijd. and in an interview in the VARA gids (2002). Hirsi Ali asserted in her 2006 autobiography (2007 in English) Infidel that she had already made full disclosure of the discrepancy to VVD officials back when she was invited to run for parliament in 2002. On the issue of her name, she applied under her grandfather's surname in her asylum application ('Ali' instead of what had till then been 'Magan'), to which she was entitled nonetheless; she later said it was to escape detection and retaliation by her clan for the foiled marriage. In the later parliamentary investigation of Hirsi Ali's immigration, the Dutch law governing names was reviewed. An applicant may legally use a surname derived from any generation as far back as the grandparent. Therefore, Hirsi Ali's application, though against her clan custom of names, was legal under Dutch law. The question of her age was of minor concern. Media speculation arose in 2006 that she could lose her Dutch citizenship because of these issues, rendering her ineligible for parliament. At first, Minister Rita Verdonk said she would not look into the matter. She later decided to investigate Hirsi Ali's naturalisation process. The investigation found that Hirsi Ali had not legitimately received Dutch citizenship, because she had lied about her name and date of birth. However, later inquiries established that she was entitled to use the name Ali because it was her grandfather's name. Verdonk moved to annul Hirsi Ali's citizenship, an action later overridden at the urging of Parliament.

On 15 May 2006, after the broadcast of the Zembla documentary, news stories appeared saying that Hirsi Ali was likely to move to the United States that September. She was reported to be planning to write a book titled Shortcut to Enlightenment and to work for the American Enterprise Institute. On 16 May Hirsi Ali resigned from Parliament after admitting that she had lied on her asylum application. In a press conference she said that the facts had been publicly known since 2002, when they had been reported in the media and in one of her publications. She also restated her claim of seeking asylum to prevent a forced marriage, stating: "How often do people who are seeking refuge provide different names? The penalty of stripping me of my Dutch citizenship is disproportional." Her stated reason for resigning immediately was the increasing media attention. Owing to the fact that a Dutch court had ruled in April 2006, that she had to leave her house by August 2006, she decided to relocate to the United States in September 2006.

After a long and emotional debate in the Dutch Parliament, all major parties supported a motion requesting the Minister to explore the possibility of special circumstances in Hirsi Ali's case. Although Verdonk remained convinced that the applicable law did not leave her room to consider such circumstances, she decided to accept the motion. During the debate, she said that Hirsi Ali still had Dutch citizenship during the period of reexamination. Apparently the "decision" she had announced had represented the current position of the Dutch government. Hirsi Ali at that point had six weeks to react to the report before any final decision about her citizenship was taken. Verdonk was strongly criticised for her actions in such a sensitive case. In addition to her Dutch passport, Hirsi Ali retained a Dutch residency permit based on being a political refugee. According to the minister, this permit could not be taken away from her since it had been granted more than 12 years before.

Reacting to news of Hirsi Ali's planned relocation to the US, former VVD leader Hans Wiegel stated that her departure "would not be a loss to the VVD and not be a loss to the House of Representatives". He said that Hirsi Ali was a brave woman, but that her opinions were polarizing. Former parliamentary leader of the VVD, Jozias van Aartsen, said that it is "painful for Dutch society and politics that she is leaving the House of Representatives". Another VVD MP, Bibi de Vries, said that if something were to happen to Hirsi Ali, some people in her party would have "blood on their hands". United States Deputy Secretary of State Robert Zoellick said in May 2006, "we recognise that she is a very courageous and impressive woman and she is welcome in the US."

On 23 May 2006, Ayaan Hirsi made available to The New York Times some letters she believed would provide insight into her 1992 asylum application. In one letter her sister Haweya warned her that the entire extended family was searching for her (after she had fled to the Netherlands), and in another letter her father denounced her. Christopher DeMuth, president of the American Enterprise Institute (AEI), said that the asylum controversy would not affect the appointment. He stated that he was still looking forward to "welcoming her to AEI, and to America."

On 27 June 2006, the Dutch government announced that Hirsi Ali would keep her Dutch citizenship. On the same day a letter was disclosed in which Hirsi Ali expressed regret for misinforming Minister Verdonk. Hirsi Ali was allowed to retain her name. Dutch immigration rules allowed asylum seekers to use grandparents' names. Her grandfather had used the last name Ali until his thirties and then switched to Magan, which was her father's and family's surname. This grandfather's birth year of 1845 had complicated the investigation. (Hirsi Ali's father Hirsi Magan Isse was the youngest of his many children and born when her grandfather was close to 90). Later the same day Hirsi Ali, through her lawyer and in television interviews, stated that she had signed the resignation letter, drafted by the Justice Department, under duress. She felt it was forced in order for her to keep her passport, but she had not wanted to complicate her pending visa application for the US.  she still carried her Dutch passport.

In a special parliamentary session on 28 June 2006, questions were raised about these issues. The ensuing political upheaval on 29 June ultimately led to the fall of the second Balkenende cabinet.

Life in the U.S. 

In 2006, Hirsi Ali took a position at the American Enterprise Institute in Washington, D.C.; as the Dutch government continued to provide security for her, this required an increase in their effort and costs.

On 17 April 2007, the local Muslim community in Johnstown, Pennsylvania protested Hirsi Ali's planned lecture at the local campus of the University of Pittsburgh. Pittsburgh imam Fouad El Bayly said that the activist deserved the death sentence but should be tried and judged in an Islamic country.

On 25 September 2007, Hirsi Ali received her United States Permanent Resident Card (green card). In October 2007, she returned to the Netherlands, continuing her work for AEI from a secret address in the Netherlands. The Dutch minister of Justice Hirsch Ballin had informed her of his ruling that, as of 1 October 2007, the Dutch government would no longer pay for her security abroad. That year she declined an offer to live in Denmark, saying she intended to return to the United States.

She was a Fellow with the Future of Diplomacy Project at the Belfer Center for Science and International Affairs at The Harvard Kennedy School from 2016 to 2019.

Al-Qaeda hit list 

In 2010, Anwar al-Awlaki published a hit list in his Inspire magazine, including Ayaan Hirsi Ali, Geert Wilders and Salman Rushdie along with cartoonists Lars Vilks and three Jyllands-Posten staff members: Kurt Westergaard, Carsten Juste, and Flemming Rose. The list was later expanded to include Stéphane "Charb" Charbonnier, who was murdered in 2015 in a terror attack on Charlie Hebdo in Paris, along with 11 other people. After the attack, Al-Qaeda called for more killings.

Brandeis University 

In early 2014, Brandeis University in Massachusetts announced that Ali would be given an honorary degree at the graduation commencement ceremony. In early April, the university rescinded its offer following a review of her statements that was carried out in response to protests by the Council on American–Islamic Relations (CAIR) and lobbying by Joseph E. B. Lumbard, Head of the Islamic Studies Department, other faculty members and several student groups that accused Hirsi Ali of "hate speech". University president Frederick M. Lawrence said that "certain of her past statements" were inconsistent with the university's "core values" because they were "Islamophobic". Others expressed opinions both for and against this decision. The university said she was welcome to come to the campus for a dialogue in the future.

The university's withdrawal of its invitation generated controversy and condemnation among some. But, The Economist noted at the time that Hirsi Ali's "Wholesale condemnations of existing religions just aren't done in American politics." It said that "The explicit consensus in America is ecumenical and strongly pro-religious". The university was distinguishing between an open intellectual exchange, which could occur if Hirsi Ali came to campus for a dialogue, and appearing to celebrate her with an honorary degree.

A Brandeis spokesperson said that Ali had not been invited to speak at commencement but simply to be among honorary awardees. She claimed to have been invited to speak and expressed shock at Brandeis' action. Hirsi Ali said CAIR's letter misrepresented her and her work, but that it has long been available on the Internet. She said that the "spirit of free expression" has been betrayed and stifled.

David Bernstein, a law professor at George Mason University, criticised the Brandeis decision as an attack on academic values of freedom of inquiry and intellectual independence.

Lawrence J. Haas, the former communications director and press secretary for Vice President Al Gore, published an open letter saying that Brandeis' president had "succumbed to political correctness and interest group pressure in deciding that Islam is beyond the pale of legitimate inquiry ... that such a decision is particularly appalling for a university president, for a campus is precisely the place to encourage free discussion even on controversial matters."

Designation by Southern Poverty Law Center 

In October 2016, the Southern Poverty Law Center accused Ayaan, and the Muslim activist Maajid Nawaz, of being "anti-Muslim extremists", which caused protests in several prominent newspapers. The Lantos Foundation for Human Rights & Justice wrote a public letter to the SPLC asking them to retract the listings.

In April 2018, the SPLC retracted the "Anti-Muslim Extremist" List in its entirety after Nawaz threatened legal action over his inclusion on the list.

Australia tour 
In April 2017, she cancelled a planned tour of Australia. This followed the Facebook release of a video by six Australian Muslim women who accused her of being a "star of the global Islamophobia industry" and of profiting from "an industry that exists to dehumanize Muslim women" but did not call for her to cancel her trip. Ali responded that the women in question were "carrying water" for the causes of radical Islamists and stated that "Islamophobia" is a manufactured word. She said that the cancellation was due to organisational problems.

Social and political views 

Hirsi Ali joined the VVD political party in 2002; it combines "classically liberal" views on the economy, foreign policy, crime and immigration with a liberal social stance on abortion and homosexuality. She says that she admires Frits Bolkestein, a former Euro-commissioner and ideological leader of the party.

Hirsi Ali is the founder and president of the AHA Foundation, a non-profit humanitarian organisation to protect women and girls in the U.S. against political Islam and harmful tribal customs that violate U.S. law and international conventions. Through the AHA Foundation, Hirsi Ali campaigns against the denial of education for girls, female genital mutilation, forced marriage, honour violence and killings, and suppression of information about the crimes through the misuse and misinterpretation of rights to freedom of religion and free speech in the U.S. and the West.

Islam and Muslims 

Hirsi Ali is critical of the treatment of women in Islamic societies and the punishments demanded by conservative Islamic scholars for homosexuality, blasphemy and adultery. She publicly identified as Muslim until 28 May 2002, when she acknowledged in her diary that she knew she was not.

She also explained in an interview that she began a serious reassessment of her religious beliefs after the 9/11 attacks and when she was drinking wine in an Italian restaurant, stating "I asked myself: Why should I burn in hell just because I'm drinking this? But what prompted me even more was the fact that the killers of 9/11 all believed in the same God I believed in."

In a 2007 interview in the London Evening Standard, Hirsi Ali characterised Islam as "the new fascism":

Just like Nazism started with Hitler's vision, the Islamic vision is a caliphate—a society ruled by Sharia law—in which women who have sex before marriage are stoned to death, homosexuals are beaten, and apostates like me are killed. Sharia law is as inimical to liberal democracy as Nazism ... Violence is inherent in Islam—it's a destructive, nihilistic cult of death. It legitimates murder.

In a 2007 article in Reason, Hirsi Ali said that Islam, the religion, must be defeated and that "we are at war with Islam. And there's no middle ground in wars." She said, "Islam, period. Once it's defeated, it can mutate into something peaceful. It's very difficult to even talk about peace now. They're not interested in peace ... There comes a moment when you crush your enemy. ... and if you don't do that, then you have to live with the consequence of being crushed." Adding: "the Christian powers have accepted the separation of the worldly and the divine. We don't interfere with their religion, and they don't interfere with the state. That hasn't happened in Islam."

She reiterated her position that the problem isn't just a few "rotten apples" in the Islamic community but "I'm saying it's the entire basket." She stated that the majority of Muslims aren't "moderates" and they must radically alter their religion. Max Rodenbeck, writing in The New York Review of Books, noted that Ali now narrowly criticizes what she calls "Medina Muslims", meaning the fundamentalists who envision a regime based on sharia, and who ignore the more inclusive passages of Muhammad's Meccan period, a small minority of Muslims, who are, nevertheless, quite influential among young Muslims, according to Hirsi Ali: "These men, I find them to be far more influential in inspiring and mobilising young men to see the religion of Islam the way they see it, than the way either Imam Faisal says he sees it, or Maajid Nawaz says he sees it."

Ayaan Hirsi Ali stated that, in her opinion, "The Christian extremists here, in the United States, who take the Bible and use it to kill people and hurt people, they are the fringe, but unfortunately, what we are seeing in Muslim countries is that the people who feel they should be governed under the Sharia Law, are not a fringe. ... Islam can become a religion of peace, if politics is divorced from religion", and she stated that: "The individual that wants to kill me because I am an apostate of Islam, is inspired to do that from the scripture of Islam, the example of the prophet Mohammed, the clergy that preached to him, and the reward that he will get in the hereafter."

Although Hirsi Ali has previously described Islam as beyond reform, she has stated that the Arab spring and growing visibility of women's rights activists within Muslim societies has demonstrated to her that a liberal reformation of Islam is possible, and outlines how this could be achieved in her book Heretic by supporting reformist Muslims.

She described Islamic societies as lagging "in enlightened thinking, tolerance and knowledge of other cultures" and that their history cannot cite a single person who "made a discovery in science or technology, or changed the world through artistic achievement".

In a 2010 interview with The Guardian, she compared the responses of Christians and Muslims to criticism of their respective religions. While Christians would often simply ignore criticism, Muslims would instead take offence, display a victim mentality and take criticism as insults.

She insists that many contemporary Muslims have not yet transitioned to modernity, and that many Muslim immigrants are culturally unsuited to life in the West and are therefore a burden. Ali calls upon atheists, Christians, Europeans, and Americans to unite against Muslim extremism in the West. She urges the former to educate Muslims and the latter, especially Western Churches, to convert "as many Muslims as possible to Christianity, introducing them to a God who rejects Holy War and who has sent his son to die for all sinners out of love for mankind". Hirsi Ali stated that: "Islam needs a reformation. Muslim leaders who are serious about achieving true and enduring peace, need to revise the Quran and the Hadith, so there is a consistency between what the peaceloving Muslims want and what their religion says."

Speaking in April 2015 on an Australian Broadcasting Corporation radio program, Hirsi Ali said,

It's wrong for Western leaders like [former Prime Minister of Australia] Tony Abbott to say the actions of the Islamic State aren't about religion. I want to say to him 'please don't say such things in public because it's just not true.' You're letting down all the individuals who are reformers within Islam who are asking the right questions that will ultimately bring about change.

In an interview following the November 2015 Paris attacks, Hirsi Ali responded to Barack Obama's statement that the West should not declare a war on Islam by agreeing that while Western civilization is not at war with the Muslim world as a whole, Islamic extremists and terrorists who are abetted by conservative Islamic nations such as Saudi Arabia and Qatar and invoke Islamic theology are waging a war on Western society and that American and European governments need to understand Islamic fundamentalism is an ongoing threat to Westernized society which predates 9/11.

Speaking shortly after the 2015 San Bernardino shooting, Hirsi Ali commented on the nature of radicalization within communities of Islamic believers, stating, "If we talk about the process of what we now call radicalization, that you see a process where individuals are putting on a religious identity. It's all about being a Muslim, you shed the rest of it or you downplay the rest of it and you try to make everyone else as pious as yourself. And this would be, looking back at San Bernardino, the telltale signs. These changes that the family, the friends, the close circle of relatives should have observed."

When discussing Muslims who become radicalized by Islamic state on the internet, Hirsi Ali argued that many of these people already adhered to fundamentalist Islamic ideas or came from families and communities that followed a literal practice of Islam before ISIS declared a caliphate, and that ISIS now gave them a focus to execute their beliefs. She commented that what the media has come to refer to as radical Islam or extremist individuals are in fact Muslims who become more pious in their beliefs and take both the Quran and examples set by the Islamic prophet Muhammad literally. She concluded that "people who have that mentality and that mindset are not a minority and they are not a fringe minority. Because of the large number of people who believe in this within Muslim communities and families who believe in this, definitely not all, but it is so large that these individuals who want to take action, who want to take it beyond believing and beyond practicing but actually want to kill people, they have a large enough group to hide in."

In a 2016 presentation for the American conservative platform Prager University, Hirsi Ali asserted that a reform of Islam was vital. She elaborated that while the majority of Muslims are peaceful, Islam as a belief-system in its current form cannot be considered a religion of peace as justification for violence against homosexuals, apostates and those deemed guilty blasphemy are still clearly stated within Islamic scripture and that Western leaders need to stop downplaying the link between Islam and Islamic terrorism. She also added that Western progressives have often dismissed reformist and dissident Muslims as "not representative" and accused any criticism of Islam as racist. She argued that instead, Western liberals should assist and ally themselves with Muslim reformists who put themselves at risk to push for change by drawing a parallel to when Russian dissidents who internally challenged the ideology of the Soviet Union during the Cold War were celebrated and assisted by people in the West.

In 2017, Hirsi Ali spoke of how Dawah is often a precursor to Islamism. In an article for The Sun she stated "in theory, dawa is a simple call to Islam. As Islamists practice the concept, however, it is a subversive, indoctrinating precursor to jihad. A process of methodical brainwashing that rejects assimilation and places Muslims in opposition to Western civic ideals. It is facilitated by funding from the Middle East, local charities and is carried out in mosques, Islamic centres, Muslim schools and even in people's living rooms. Its goal is to erode and ultimately destroy the political institutions of a free society and replace them with Sharia law."

In September 2020, Hirsi Ali compared "Wokeism" and the Black Lives Matter movement to ISIS, saying both reflected the "intolerant doctrines of a religious cult".

Muhammad 

Hirsi Ali criticises the central Islamic prophet on morality and personality traits (criticisms based on biographical details or depictions by Islamic texts and early followers of Muhammad). In January 2003 she told the Dutch paper Trouw, "Muhammad is, seen by our Western standards, a pervert and a tyrant", as he married, at the age of 53, Aisha, who was six years old and nine at the time the marriage was consummated. She later said: "Perhaps I should have said 'a pedophile'". Muslims filed a religious discrimination suit against her that year. The civil court in the Hague acquitted Hirsi Ali of any charges, but said that she "could have made a better choice of words".

Genital mutilation 

Hirsi Ali is an opponent of female genital mutilation (FGM), which she has criticized in many of her writings. When in the Dutch parliament, she proposed obligatory annual medical checks for all uncircumcised girls living in the Netherlands who came from countries where FGM is practised. She proposed that if a physician found that such a girl had been mutilated, a report to the police would be required—with protection of the child prevailing over privacy. In 2004, she also criticised male circumcision, particularly as practiced by Jews and Muslims, which she regarded as being another variant of mutilation practiced without the consent of the individual.

Feminism 

Hirsi Ali has criticized Western feminists for avoiding the issue of the subjugation of women in the Muslim world and singled out Germaine Greer for arguing that FGM needs to be considered a "cultural identity" that Western women don't understand.

During the Brandeis University controversy, Hirsi Ali noted that "an authority on 'Queer/Feminist Narrative Theory' ... [sided] with the openly homophobic Islamists" in speaking against her.

Rich Lowry wrote in Politico that while Hirsi Ali had many traits which should have made her a "feminist hero" such as being a refugee from an abusive patriarchy, being an African immigrant who made her way to a Western country and an advocate for women's rights, this does not happen because she is "a dissident of the wrong religion". Feminists instead criticise Hirsi Ali for "strengthening racism" instead of "weakening sexism".

Freedom of speech 

In a 2006 lecture in Berlin, she defended the right to offend, following the Jyllands-Posten Muhammad cartoons controversy in Denmark. She condemned the journalists of those papers and TV channels that did not show their readers the cartoons as being "mediocre of mind". She also praised publishers all over Europe for showing the cartoons and not being afraid of what she called the "hard-line Islamist movement". In 2017, Hirsi Ali described the word Islamophobia as a "manufactured term" and argued "we can't stop the injustices if we say everything is Islamophobic and hide behind a politically correct screen."

Political opponents 

In 2006, Hirsi Ali as MP supported the move by the Dutch courts to abrogate the party subsidy to a conservative Protestant Christian political party, the Political Reformed Party (SGP), which did not grant full membership rights to women and withholds passive voting rights from female members. She said that any political party discriminating against women or homosexuals should be deprived of funding.

Opposition to denominational or faith schools 

In the Netherlands about half of all education has historically been provided by sponsored religious schools, most of them Catholic or Protestant. As Muslims began to ask for support for schools, the state provided it and by 2005, there were 41 Islamic schools in the nation. This was based on the idea in the 1960s that Muslims could become one of the "pillars" of Dutch society, as were Protestants, Catholics and secular residents. Hirsi Ali has opposed state funding of any religious schools, including Islamic ones. In a 2007 interview with London-based Evening Standard, Hirsi Ali urged the British government to close all Muslim faith schools in the country and instead integrate Muslim pupils into mainstream society, arguing "Britain is sleepwalking into a society that could be ruled by Sharia law within decades unless Islamic schools are shut down and young Muslims are instead made to integrate and accept Western liberal values." In 2017, Hirsi Ali reasserted her belief that Islamic faith schools should be closed if they are found to be indoctrinating their students into political Islam and that such faith schools often exist in migrant dominated communities where students will have a lesser chance of integrating into mainstream society and that such cultural and educational "cocooning" breeds a lack of understanding or hostility towards the host culture. In 2020, Hirsi Ali stated that children in predominantly Muslim schools are less likely to be taught about the Holocaust and argued that schools should not cave into demands from Muslim parents that children should not be taught to remember the Holocaust in history lessons.

Development aid 

The Netherlands has always been one of the most prominent countries that support aiding developing countries. As the spokesperson of the VVD in the parliament on this matter, Hirsi Ali said that the current aid policy had not achieved an increase in prosperity, peace and stability in developing countries: "The VVD believes that Dutch international aid has failed until now, as measured by [the Dutch aid effects on] poverty reduction, famine reduction, life expectancy and the promotion of peace."

Immigration 
In 2003, Hirsi Ali worked together with fellow VVD MP Geert Wilders for several months. They questioned the government about immigration policy. In reaction to the UN Development Programme Arab Human Development Report, Hirsi Ali asked questions of Minister of Foreign Affairs Jaap de Hoop Scheffer and the Minister without Portfolio for Development Cooperation Agnes van Ardenne. Together with Wilders, she asked the government to pay attention to the consequences for Dutch policy concerning the limitation of immigration from the Arab world to Europe, and in particular the Netherlands.

Although she publicly supported the policy of VVD minister Rita Verdonk to limit immigration, privately she was not supportive, as she explained in a June 2006 interview for Opzij. This interview was given after she resigned from Parliament, and shortly after she had moved to the United States.

In parliament, Hirsi Ali had supported the way Verdonk handled the Pasić case, although privately she felt that Pasić should have been allowed to stay. On the night before the debate, she phoned Verdonk to tell her that she had lied when she applied for asylum in the Netherlands, just as Pasić had. She said that Verdonk responded that if she had been minister at that time, she would have had Hirsi Ali deported.

In 2015, when Donald Trump suggested a complete ban on all Muslims entering the United States as part of his presidential campaign, Hirsi Ali responded by saying that such a pledge gave "false hope" to voters by questioning the reality of how such policy would be implemented and in practice it would offer a short-term solution to a long term ideological issue. However, she also praised Trump's campaign messages for highlighting the problems posed by Islamic fundamentalism and said the outgoing Obama administration had "conspicuously avoided any discussion of Islamic theology, even avoiding use of the term radical Islam altogether."

In response to the Trump administration's Executive Order 13769 which imposed a travel ban on and temporarily restricted immigration and visa applications from several Muslim majority countries, Hirsi Ali described the ban as both "clumsy" but also "too narrow" for excluding nations such as Pakistan and Saudi Arabia who have been implicated in terrorism. However, she also stated agreement with Trump's assertion that some immigrants from Muslim nations are less likely to adapt to a Westernized lifestyle or are harder to screen as potential security risks, citing Ahmad Khan Rahami and Tashfeen Malik as examples of Muslims who entered the U.S. on immigration visas before committing acts of terrorism. She also maintained that as an immigrant herself, she was not opposed to Muslim immigrants coming to America seeking a better life but expressed concern over the attitudes that younger generations of Muslim-Americans bring with them and that society had a limited capacity to change those values. She has also defended the right for Western nations to screen all prospective Muslim immigrants to assess their beliefs and deport or deny residency to those who display sympathetic views to fundamentalism and violence.

In 2020, Ayaan echoed statements made by French President Emmanuel Macron that Muslim immigrant communities, composed of both newly arrived migrants and second generation immigrants, had formed "separatist societies" in some European nations, and that there are "pockets of Europe" where Muslims have limited access to education or jobs and extremist Muslims "come in and take advantage of them." She also argued that many of the problems Europe faces in the twenty-first century with terrorism and parallel societies was born out of "racism of low expectations" in the past, in which European governments did not expect immigrants from Middle Eastern or African backgrounds to become Europeanized or have the capability to contribute positively, but instead out of misguided compassion, multicultural sentiments and political correctness, encouraged immigrants to keep their native cultures or caved into demands from religiously conservative immigrant communities who rejected European culture.

Hirsi Ali discussed her view on immigration in Europe, in an op-ed article published in the Los Angeles Times in 2006. Noting that immigrants are over-represented "in all the wrong statistics", she wrote that the European Union's immigration policy contributed to the illegal trade in women and arms, and the exploitation of poor migrants by "cruel employers".

She drew attention to the numerous illegal immigrants already in the European Union. She believed that current immigration policy would lead to ethnic and religious division, nation states will lose their monopoly of force, Islamic law (sharia) will be introduced at the level of neighborhoods and cities, and exploitation of women and children will become "commonplace". To avoid this situation, she proposes three general principles for a new policy:

 Admission of immigrants on the basis of their contribution to the economy. The current system "is designed to attract the highest number of people with truly heartbreaking stories".
 Diplomatic, economic and military interventions in countries that cause large migrant flows.
 Introduction of assimilation programs that acknowledge that "the basic tenets of Islam are a major obstacle to integration".

Regarding unemployment, social marginalization and poverty among certain immigrant communities, Hirsi Ali places the burden of responsibility squarely on Islam and migrant culture.

In 2010, she opposed the idea of preventing immigrants from traditional Muslim societies from immigrating, claiming that allowing them to immigrate made the U.S. a "highly moral country". The subject is also discussed in her 2017 Hoover Institution Press publication "The Challenge of Dawa, Political Islam as Ideology and Movement and How to Counter It".

In 2017, Hirsi Ali identified what she regarded as four categories of Muslim immigrants and asylum seekers in the West she has encountered in her personal and professional life:

 Adapters, who over time embrace core values of Western democracies, adapt to public life and use freedoms found in the West to educate and economically better themselves.
 Menaces, mostly poorly assimilated young men who routinely commit crimes and acts of violence.
 Coasters, men and women with little formal education who live off welfare and use lax immigration rules to invite extended family to do the same.
 Fanatics, who abuse freedoms given to them in Western nations that gave them sanctuary to impose an uncompromising practice of Islam.

However, she also maintained that each category is not rigid and menaces can become fanatics by becoming exposed to Islamism in prison while the children of immigrant adapters can turn into fanatics through rejecting liberalism and embracing stricter and fundamentalist branches of Islam. She has also written in support of refusing residency and citizenship to those who cannot become adapters.

Assimilation 

"When I speak of assimilation", Ali clarifies, "I mean assimilation into civilization. Aboriginals, Afghanis, Somalis, Arabs, Native Americans—all these non-Western groups have to make that transition to modernity". Sadiya Abubakar Isa criticized these comments in an article for the Indonesian Journal of Islam and Muslim Societies, accusing her of Orientalism.

Israel and the Palestinians 

Hirsi Ali has expressed support for Israel:

As for Israel's problems, Hirsi Ali says, "From my superficial impression, the country also has a problem with fundamentalists. The ultra-Orthodox will cause a demographic problem because these fanatics have more children than the secular and the regular Orthodox."

On Palestinians:

On the way Israel is perceived in the Netherlands:

The crisis of Dutch socialism can be sized up in its attitudes toward both Islam and Israel. It holds Israel to exceptionally high moral standards. The Israelis, however, will always do well, because they themselves set high standards for their actions. The standards for judging the Palestinians, however, are very low. Most outsiders remain silent on all the problems in their territories. That helps the Palestinians become even more corrupt than they already are. Those who live in the territories are not allowed to say anything about this because they risk being murdered by their own people.

Hirsi Ali has also said Western governments should stop "demonizing" the state of Israel and instead look to the country as an example of how to implement efficient border security and counter-terrorism measures. Hirsi Ali has praised Israel prime minister Benjamin Netanyahu leadership in Israel and has said he deserves a Nobel Peace Prize.

Personal life 

Hirsi Ali married British historian Niall Ferguson on 10 September 2011. They have two sons.

Reception 

Hirsi Ali has attracted praise and criticism from English-speaking commentators. Literary critic and journalist Christopher Hitchens regarded her as "the most important public intellectual probably ever to come out of Africa." Patt Morrison of the Los Angeles Times called Hirsi Ali a freedom fighter for feminism who has "put her life on the line to defend women against radical Islam."

Tunku Varadarajan wrote in 2017 that, with "multiple fatwas on her head, Hirsi Ali has a greater chance of meeting a violent end than anyone I've met, Salman Rushdie included." According to Andrew Anthony of The Guardian, Ayaan Hirsi Ali is admired by secularists and "loathed not just by Islamic fundamentalists but by many western liberals, who find her rejection of Islam almost as objectionable as her embrace of western liberalism."

The Caged Virgin 

In his 2006 review of this collection of seventeen essays and articles on Islam by Hirsi Ali, journalist Christopher Hitchens noted her three themes: "first, her own gradual emancipation from tribalism and superstition; second, her work as a parliamentarian to call attention to the crimes being committed every day by Islamist thugs in mainland Europe; and third, the dismal silence, or worse, from many feminists and multiculturalists about this state of affairs."

He described the activist as a "charismatic figure in Dutch politics" and criticised the Dutch government for how it protected her from Islamic threats after her collaboration with Theo van Gogh on the short film Submission and the assassination of the director.

Mahmood noted that the title of the work is "highly reminiscent of the nineteenth-century literary genre centered on Orientalist fantasies of the harem".

Infidel: My Life (2007 in English) 

The Guardian summarised Infidel thus: "[Hirsi Ali]'s is a story of exile from her clan through war, famine, arranged marriage, religious apostasy and the shocking murder on the streets of Amsterdam of her collaborator, Theo van Gogh. Told with lyricism, wit, huge sorrow and a great heart, this is one of the most amazing adventure narratives of the age of mass migration."

William Grimes wrote in The New York Times: "The circuitous, violence-filled path that led Ms. Hirsi Ali from Somalia to the Netherlands is the subject of "Infidel," her brave, inspiring and beautifully written memoir. Narrated in clear, vigorous prose, it traces the author's geographical journey from Mogadishu to Saudi Arabia, Ethiopia and Kenya, and her desperate flight to the Netherlands to escape an arranged marriage."

In his critique of the book, Christopher Hitchens noted that two leading leftist intellectual commentators, Timothy Garton Ash and Ian Buruma, described Hirsi Ali as an "Enlightenment fundamentalist[s]". Hitchens noted further that, far from being a "fundamentalist", Hirsi escaped from a "society where women are subordinate, censorship is pervasive, and violence is officially preached against unbelievers."

Nomad: From Islam to America 

The Guardian observed that Nomad describes "a clan system shattering on the shores of modernity". The books expands Hirsi Ali's previous early life descriptions focusing on "the remarkable figure of her grandmother, who gave birth to daughters alone in the desert and cut her own umbilical cord, raged at herself for producing too many girls, rebelled against her husband, arranged for the circumcision of her granddaughters and instilled in them an unforgiving, woman-hating religion." According to the newspaper's review, "Hirsi Ali observes that her own nomadic journey has been taken across borders that have been mental as much as geographical. In Nomad she calls her ancestral voices into direct confrontation with her demands for reform of Islamic theology. The result is electrifying."

Hirsi Ali called Nomad her most provocative book for urging moderate Muslims to become Christians. She later backed off from this view. After witnessing the Arab Spring, Hirsi Ali also took back her argument in Nomad that Islam is beyond reform.

Heretic: Why Islam Needs a Reformation Now 

In the book Hirsi Ali quoted statistics such that 75% of Pakistanis favour the death penalty for apostasy and argue that Sharia law is gaining ground in many Muslim-majority nations. Hirsi Ali quotes verses in the Qur'an encouraging followers to use violence and make the argument that as long as the Qur'an is perceived to be the literal divine words, violent extremists have a justification for their acts.

Andrew Anthony for The Guardian in 2015 wrote that even her fiercest critics would have problems denying what Hirsi Ali writes about current issues in Islam and since those issues are unpalatable an added difficulty was a cultural practice at the time to "not offend anyone". Anthony concluded that regardless of what critics may think of her solution, Hirsi Ali should be commended for her "unblinking determination to address the problem".

Susan Dominus of The New York Times wrote: "In "Heretic," Hirsi Ali forgoes autobiography for the most part in favor of an extended argument. But she has trouble making anyone else's religious history—even that of Muhammad himself, whose life story she recounts—as dramatic as she has made her own. And she loses the reader's trust with overblown rhetoric. ... She tries to warn Americans about their naïveté in the face of encroaching Islamic influences, maintaining that officials and journalists, out of cultural sensitivity, sometimes play down the honor killings that occur in the West."

The Economist wrote: "Unfortunately, very few Muslims will accept Ms Hirsi Ali's full-blown argument, which insists that Islam must change in at least five important ways. A moderate Muslim might be open to discussion of four of her suggestions if the question were framed sensitively. Muslims, she says, must stop prioritizing the afterlife over this life; they must 'shackle sharia' and respect secular law; they must abandon the idea of telling others, including non-Muslims, how to behave, dress or drink; and they must abandon holy war. However, her biggest proposal is a show-stopper: she wants her old co-religionists to 'ensure that Muhammad and the Koran are open to interpretation and criticism.'"

Clifford May of The Washington Times wrote: "The West is enmeshed in 'an ideological conflict' that cannot be won 'until the concept of jihad has itself been decommissioned.'" May goes on to suggest that if "American and Western leaders continue to refuse to comprehend who is fighting us and why, the consequences will be dire."

In May 2015, Mehdi Hasan wrote an article in The Guardian arguing that Islam does not need a reformation, and that she will never win any fans over from Muslims, regardless of whether they are liberal or conservative. Hasan wrote: "She's been popping up in TV studios and on op-ed pages to urge Muslims, both liberal and conservative, to abandon some of their core religious beliefs while uniting behind a Muslim Luther. Whether or not mainstream Muslims will respond positively to a call for reform from a woman who has described the Islamic faith as a 'destructive, nihilistic cult of death' that should be 'crushed' and also suggesting that Benjamin Netanyahu be given the Nobel Peace Prize, is another matter." Hasan also invoked the death toll of the Christian sectarian conflicts of Thirty Years' War and the French Wars of Religion to argue that an Islamic reformation would lead to conflicts of a similar scale. Hasan also wrote that Islamic reformation should not be promoted by non-Muslims or ex-Muslims.

Criticism 

Ali's public commentary and stances, particularly her criticisms of Islam, have elicited denunciations from a number of commentators and academics. Ibrahim Hooper, a spokesman for the Council on American-Islamic Relations, condemned her as "one of the worst of the worst of the Islam haters in America, not only in America but worldwide." Saba Mahmood wrote that Hirsi Ali "had no public profile until she decided to capitalize on the anti-Muslim sentiment that swept Europe following the events of 9/11". Adam Yaghi has questioned her appeal in American society where her "serial autobiographies are treated as honest and reliable testimonies in spite of the troubling inaccuracies, exaggerated descriptions, blunt neo-Orientalist portrayals, and sweeping generalizations". Stephen Sheehi wrote that in spite of her lack of scholarly credentials and academic qualifications "to speak authoritatively about Islam and the Arab world", Hirsi Ali has been accepted in the West as a scholar, feminist activist, and reformer primarily on the grounds of her "insider claims about Islam".

Other critics have called Ali an "inauthentic ethnic voice" at the service of "imperialist feminism". Kiran Grewal asserted that Ali is "a classic enactment of the colonial 'civilizing mission' discourse", while Salon's Nathan Lean called Hirsi Ali's story as the "modern-day version of [a] hoary captivity narrative" of the type popular during the Barbary Wars. Grewal described Ali's works as using "the language of 'lived experience' to justify an intolerant and exclusionary message" and alleged that her "extremely provocative and often offensive statements regarding Islam and Muslim immigrants in the West" had alienated some feminists and academics.

Yaghi commented that "Ali attributes everything bad to a monolithic Islam, one that transcends geographic and national boundaries ... willfully ignoring her own distinctions between different interpretations of Islam, versions she personally encountered before leaving to the West". Pearl Abraham has made a similar observation: "[I]n her writings, lectures, and interviews", Ali "reaches for the simple solution and quick answer. Always and everywhere, she insists on depicting Islam and Muslims as the enemy, her tribal culture as backward". Hirsi Ali is also criticized for persistently singling out Islam and Muslims, but never manifestations of religious revivalism present with other religions.

According to Rula Jebreal, a Palestinian journalist and foreign policy analyst, Ali's criticism applies mostly to "Wahhabism", the strain of Islam most familiar to Hirsi Ali, and not to Islam as a whole. Jebreal added that Ali's "outbursts" originated from her own pain, "physical scars inflicted on her body during childhood", which were justified by a radical version of the religion into which she was born. Jebreal wrote: "To endorse Hirsi Ali so unabashedly is to insult and mock a billion Muslims. It's time to listen to what is being said by the Muslim voices of peace and tolerance. Ayaan Hirsi Ali is not one of them."

Publications 

Hirsi Ali has continued discussion of these issues in her two autobiographies, published in Dutch in 2006 and in English in 2010. In her first work, she said that in 1992 her father arranged to marry her to a distant cousin. She says that she objected to this both on general grounds (she has said she dreaded being forced to submit to a stranger, sexually and socially), and specifically to this man, whom she described as a "bigot" and an "idiot" in her book.

She told her family that she planned to join her husband, who was living in Canada, after obtaining a visa while in Germany. However, in her autobiography, she said she spent her time in Germany trying to devise an escape from her unwanted marriage. Hirsi Ali decided to visit a relative in the Netherlands, and to seek help after arrival and claim asylum.

Her first autobiography, Infidel (2006), was published in English in 2007. In a review, American Enterprise Institute fellow Joshua Muravchik described the book as "simply a great work of literature", and compared her to novelist Joseph Conrad.

In her second autobiography, Nomad (2010, in English), Hirsi Ali wrote that in early 2006, Rita Verdonk had personally approached her to ask for her public support in Verdonk's campaign to run for party leader of the VVD. Hirsi Ali wrote that she had personally supported Verdonk's opponent, Mark Rutte, as the better choice. She says that after telling Verdonk of her position, the minister became vindictive. Hirsi Ali wrote that, after the 2006 report of the Zembla TV program, Verdonk campaigned against Ali in retaliation for her earlier lack of support.

Her latest book was released in February 2021 and is titled Prey: Immigration, Islam, and the Erosion of Women's Rights.

Ali is a contributor at The Daily Beast.She has also written columns for the New York Post, The Spectator and UnHerd. She has also hosted her own podcast since 2021, in which she interviews intellectuals.

The Caged Virgin 

In his 2006 review of this collection of seventeen essays and articles on Islam by Hirsi Ali, journalist Christopher Hitchens noted her three themes: "first, her own gradual emancipation from tribalism and superstition; second, her work as a parliamentarian to call attention to the crimes being committed every day by Islamist thugs in mainland Europe; and third, the dismal silence, or worse, from many feminists and multiculturalists about this state of affairs."

He described the activist as a "charismatic figure in Dutch politics" and criticised the Dutch government for how it protected her from Islamic threats after her collaboration with Theo van Gogh on the short film Submission and the assassination of the director.

Mahmood noted that the title of the work is "highly reminiscent of the nineteenth-century literary genre centered on Orientalist fantasies of the harem".

Infidel: My Life (2007 in English) 

The Guardian summarised Infidel thus: "[Hirsi Ali]'s is a story of exile from her clan through war, famine, arranged marriage, religious apostasy and the shocking murder on the streets of Amsterdam of her collaborator, Theo van Gogh. Told with lyricism, wit, huge sorrow and a great heart, this is one of the most amazing adventure narratives of the age of mass migration."

William Grimes wrote in The New York Times: "The circuitous, violence-filled path that led Ms. Hirsi Ali from Somalia to the Netherlands is the subject of "Infidel," her brave, inspiring and beautifully written memoir. Narrated in clear, vigorous prose, it traces the author's geographical journey from Mogadishu to Saudi Arabia, Ethiopia and Kenya, and her desperate flight to the Netherlands to escape an arranged marriage."

In his critique of the book, Christopher Hitchens noted that two leading leftist intellectual commentators, Timothy Garton Ash and Ian Buruma, described Hirsi Ali as an "Enlightenment fundamentalist[s]". Hitchens noted further that, far from being a "fundamentalist", Hirsi escaped from a "society where women are subordinate, censorship is pervasive, and violence is officially preached against unbelievers."

Nomad: From Islam to America 

The Guardian observed that Nomad describes "a clan system shattering on the shores of modernity". The books expands Hirsi Ali's previous early life descriptions focusing on "the remarkable figure of her grandmother, who gave birth to daughters alone in the desert and cut her own umbilical cord, raged at herself for producing too many girls, rebelled against her husband, arranged for the circumcision of her granddaughters and instilled in them an unforgiving, woman-hating religion." According to the newspaper's review, "Hirsi Ali observes that her own nomadic journey has been taken across borders that have been mental as much as geographical. In Nomad she calls her ancestral voices into direct confrontation with her demands for reform of Islamic theology. The result is electrifying."

Hirsi Ali called Nomad her most provocative book for urging moderate Muslims to become Christians. She later backed off from this view. After witnessing the Arab Spring, Hirsi Ali also took back her argument in Nomad that Islam is beyond reform.

Heretic: Why Islam Needs a Reformation Now 

In the book Hirsi Ali quoted statistics such that 75% of Pakistanis favour the death penalty for apostasy and argue that Sharia law is gaining ground in many Muslim-majority nations. Hirsi Ali quotes verses in the Qur'an encouraging followers to use violence and make the argument that as long as the Qur'an is perceived to be the literal divine words, violent extremists have a justification for their acts.

Andrew Anthony for The Guardian in 2015 wrote that even her fiercest critics would have problems denying what Hirsi Ali writes about current issues in Islam and since those issues are unpalatable an added difficulty was a cultural practice at the time to "not offend anyone". Anthony concluded that regardless of what critics may think of her solution, Hirsi Ali should be commended for her "unblinking determination to address the problem".

Susan Dominus of The New York Times wrote: "In "Heretic," Hirsi Ali forgoes autobiography for the most part in favor of an extended argument. But she has trouble making anyone else's religious history—even that of Muhammad himself, whose life story she recounts—as dramatic as she has made her own. And she loses the reader's trust with overblown rhetoric. ... She tries to warn Americans about their naïveté in the face of encroaching Islamic influences, maintaining that officials and journalists, out of cultural sensitivity, sometimes play down the honor killings that occur in the West."

The Economist wrote: "Unfortunately, very few Muslims will accept Ms Hirsi Ali's full-blown argument, which insists that Islam must change in at least five important ways. A moderate Muslim might be open to discussion of four of her suggestions if the question were framed sensitively. Muslims, she says, must stop prioritizing the afterlife over this life; they must 'shackle sharia' and respect secular law; they must abandon the idea of telling others, including non-Muslims, how to behave, dress or drink; and they must abandon holy war. However, her biggest proposal is a show-stopper: she wants her old co-religionists to 'ensure that Muhammad and the Koran are open to interpretation and criticism.'"

Clifford May of The Washington Times wrote: "The West is enmeshed in 'an ideological conflict' that cannot be won 'until the concept of jihad has itself been decommissioned.'" May goes on to suggest that if "American and Western leaders continue to refuse to comprehend who is fighting us and why, the consequences will be dire."

In May 2015, Mehdi Hasan wrote an article in The Guardian arguing that Islam does not need a reformation, and that she will never win any fans over from Muslims, regardless of whether they are liberal or conservative. Hasan wrote: "She's been popping up in TV studios and on op-ed pages to urge Muslims, both liberal and conservative, to abandon some of their core religious beliefs while uniting behind a Muslim Luther. Whether or not mainstream Muslims will respond positively to a call for reform from a woman who has described the Islamic faith as a 'destructive, nihilistic cult of death' that should be 'crushed' and also suggesting that Benjamin Netanyahu be given the Nobel Peace Prize, is another matter." Hasan also invoked the death toll of the Christian sectarian conflicts of Thirty Years' War and the French Wars of Religion to argue that an Islamic reformation would lead to conflicts of a similar scale. Hasan also wrote that Islamic reformation should not be promoted by non-Muslims or ex-Muslims.

Books 

 De zoontjesfabriek. Over vrouwen, islam en integratie, translated as The Son Factory: About Women, Islam and Integration. A collection of essays and lectures from before 2002. It also contains an extended interview originally published in Opzij, a feminist magazine. The book focuses on the position of Muslims in the Netherlands.
 De Maagdenkooi (2004), translated in 2006 as The Caged Virgin: A Muslim Woman's Cry for Reason a.k.a. The Caged Virgin: An Emancipation Proclamation for Women and Islam. A collection of essays and lectures from 2003 to 2004, combined with her personal experiences as a translator working for the NMS. The book focuses on the position of women in Islam.
 Infidel. An autobiography originally published in Dutch as Mijn Vrijheid in September 2006 by Augustus, Amsterdam and Antwerp, 447 pages, ; and in English in February 2007. It was edited by Richard Miniter.
 Nomad: From Islam to America: A Personal Journey Through the Clash of Civilizations. Her second autobiography, published by Free Press in 2010. 
 Heretic: Why Islam Needs a Reformation Now, published by Harper (March 2015). Hirsi Ali makes a case that a religious reformation is the only way to end the terrorism, sectarian warfare, and repression of women and minorities that each year claim thousands of lives throughout the Muslim world. 
 Prey: Immigration, Islam, and the Erosion of Women's Rights, published by Harper (July 2021). Here, Ali discusses the migration from Muslim countries to Europe which peaked during the European migrant crisis and argues that this coincided with rising levels of sexual violence towards women in the receiving countries. She also argues that governments, law enforcement and feminists appear eager to suppress attention towards illegal immigration.

Awards 

 2004, she was awarded the Prize of Liberty by the Flemish classical liberal think tank Nova Civitas.
 2004, she was chosen "Person of the Year" by the Dutch news magazine Elsevier.
 2004, she was awarded the Freedom Prize of Denmark's Liberal Party, the country's largest party, "for her work to further freedom of speech and the rights of women".

In the year following the assassination of her collaborator, Theo van Gogh, Hirsi Ali received five awards related to her activism.

 2005, she was awarded the Harriet Freezerring Emancipation Prize by Cisca Dresselhuys, editor of the feminist magazine Opzij.
 2005, she was awarded the annual European Bellwether Prize by the Norwegian think tank Human Rights Service. According to HRS, Hirsi Ali is "beyond a doubt, the leading European politician in the field of integration. (She is) a master at the art of mediating the most difficult issues with insurmountable courage, wisdom, reflectiveness, and clarity".
 2005, she was awarded the annual Democracy Prize of the Swedish Liberal People's Party "for her courageous work for democracy, human rights and women's rights."
 2005, she was ranked by American Time magazine amongst the 100 Most Influential Persons of the World, in the category of "Leaders & Revolutionaries".
 2005, she was awarded the Tolerance Prize of Madrid.
 She was voted European of the Year for 2006 by the European editors of Reader's Digest magazine.
 2006, she was given the civilian prize Glas der Vernunft in Kassel, Germany. The organisation rewarded her with this prize for her courage in criticising Islam (1 October 2006). Other laureates have included Leah Rabin, the wife of former Israeli prime-minister Yitzhak Rabin, and Hans-Dietrich Genscher, former Foreign Minister of the Federal Republic of Germany.
 2006, she received the Moral Courage Award from the American Jewish Committee.
 2007, she was given the annual Goldwater Award for 2007 from the Goldwater Institute in Phoenix, Arizona.
 2008, she was awarded the Simone de Beauvoir Prize, an international human rights prize for women's freedom, which she shared with Taslima Nasreen.
 2008, she was given the Anisfield-Wolf Book Award for nonfiction for her autobiography Infidel (2007 in English). The Anisfield-Wolf awards recognise "recent books that have made important contributions to our understanding of racism and appreciation of the rich diversity of human culture."
 2008, she was awarded the Richard Dawkins Prize (2008) by the Atheist Alliance International.
 2010, she was awarded the Emperor Has No Clothes Award by the Freedom From Religion Foundation.
 2012, she was awarded the Axel Springer Honorary Prize, "for her courageous commitment – her approach to freedom and her courage to express a nonconformist opinion."
 2015, she was awarded the Lantos Human Rights Prize for fearless leaders, reformers and rebels who have been willing to defy social and cultural norms to speak out against human rights abuses. Other laureates were Rebiya Kadeer and Irshad Manji.
 2016, she was awarded the Philip Merrill Award for Outstanding Contributions to Liberal Arts Education
 2017, she was awarded the Oxi Day Courage Award by the Washington Oxi Day Foundation

See also 

 Yasmine Mohammed
 Maryam Namazie
 Mona Walter

Notes

References

Further reading 

 Scroggins, Deborah. Wanted Women. Faith, Lies, and the War on Terror: The Lives of Ayaan Hirsi Ali and Aafia Siddiqui, HarperCollins, 2012

External links 

 
 
 
 

1969 births
Living people
20th-century atheists
21st-century American non-fiction writers
21st-century American women writers
21st-century atheists
Activists against female genital mutilation
American atheism activists
American critics of Islam
American Enterprise Institute
American feminist writers
American former Muslims
American people of Somali descent
American political writers
American screenwriters
American women's rights activists
Atheist feminists
American atheist writers
Former Muslim critics of Islam
Critics of multiculturalism
Dutch emigrants to the United States
Dutch former Muslims
Dutch women in politics
Dutch-language writers
Free speech activists
Leiden University alumni
Members of the House of Representatives (Netherlands)
Dutch critics of Islam
New Atheism
People from Mogadishu
People's Party for Freedom and Democracy politicians
People with acquired American citizenship
Somalian atheists
Somalian emigrants to the Netherlands
Somalian feminists
Dutch classical liberals
Somalian former Muslims
Somalian non-fiction writers
Somalian refugees
Somalian women's rights activists
Somalian women writers
Victims of human rights abuses
Women's rights support from the irreligious
Former Muslims turned agnostics or atheists
20th-century Somalian women writers
20th-century Somalian writers
21st-century Somalian women writers
21st-century Somalian writers
American women non-fiction writers
Hoover Institution people
African-American atheists
Member of the Mont Pelerin Society
Violence against women in Somalia